The Gogeldrie Weir is a heritage-listed former weir and now recreation area and weir at Murrumbidgee River near Narrandera, Leeton Shire, New South Wales, Australia. It was designed and built by WC & IC from 1958 to 1959. It was added to the New South Wales State Heritage Register on 2 April 1999.

History 
The Gogeldrie Weir was completed in 1959 to divert water from the Murrumbidgee River to the Coleambally Irrigation Area via the Coleambally Canal, and to part of the Murrumbidgee Irrigation Areas and associated irrigation districts via the Stuart Canal. The Coleambally Irrigation Scheme was one of the last major schemes into public irrigation by the government to enable agriculture to expand in the Coleambally south of the Murrumbidgee. The scheme utilised the regulated flows from the Snowy Scheme and the Blowering Dam. The mechanics of Coleambally were similar to the MIA, with a major diversionary weir at Gogeldrie on the Murrumbidgee distributing water by gravity through networks of canals and channels. The first farms were taken up in 1960.

Description 
The Gogeldrie Weir is one of seven major weirs on the Murrumbidgee River. The weir structure comprises concrete sill floor reinforced with steel sheet piling cut-off walls, the floor is surmounted by concrete piers and steel superstructure providing supports for the steel sluice gates. The gates are opened individually by electric motors placed centrally between piers. The gates move vertically and the counterweights drop into the counterweight wells allowed for in each of the concrete piers. The original gate control meter has been replaced by computerised meter in 1996. The weir provides a pool level suitable for the diversion of water from the Murrumbidgee River into Coleambally Canal supplying the Coleambally Irrigation Area, and via Coononcoocabil Lagoon into the Stuart Canal to supply part of the Murrumbidgee Irrigation Areas and associated irrigation districts. At full supply level, the weir holds .

Heritage listing 
As at 6 December 2000, Gogeldrie Weir is associated with the Coleambally Irrigation Area and also part of the Murrumbidgee Irrigation Area. It is a major component in the Coleambally Irrigation Scheme being the diversion weir that controls and diverts water from the Murrumbidgee River to the Coleambally area. The weir is a landmark in the region.

Gogeldrie Weir was listed on the New South Wales State Heritage Register on 2 April 1999.

See also

References

Bibliography

Attribution

External links 

New South Wales State Heritage Register
Narrandera
Parks in New South Wales
Dams in New South Wales
Articles incorporating text from the New South Wales State Heritage Register
Weirs
Dams completed in 1959
1959 establishments in Australia
Murrumbidgee River